The 2007 PlaceMakers V8 Supercars was the third round of the 2007 V8 Supercar Championship Series. It was held on the weekend of the 20 to the 22 April at Pukekohe Park Raceway in New Zealand. This round will be the last V8 Supercar event at Pukekohe until 2013, with the 2008-12 New Zealand rounds being held on the streets of Hamilton. The round was also Cameron McConville's 100th start in the V8 Supercar Championship, and ran the number 100 on his car to mark this achievement.

Report

Qualifying

Part 1
For the second round in a row, only 30 cars made the grid for qualifying after Jack Perkins from Jack Daniels Racing crashed at approximately 160 km/h into the barrier, on the main straight. The first part of qualifying began with Rick Kelly quickest, however a number of cars including Shane Price, Jason Richards and Steven Richards all ran wide at the hairpin at turn 5. Brad Jones also crashed into the tyre barriers at the hairpin after brake failure, which caused the session to be red flagged. The session was restarted with Garth Tander taking provisional pole from his team mate Rick Kelly and Todd Kelly.

Part 2
Once again, a number of drivers including Jamie Whincup, James Courtney and both Jim Beam Racing cars, ran wide at the hairpin, whilst trying to set quick laps which Craig Lowndes was quickest early on. Paul Dumbrell also crashed at turn 4, which caused the second red flag of qualifying. At the end of part 2, James Courtney lead, from Lowndes and Skaife.

Part 3
The third part of qualifying began with Whincup running wide at turn 4, and touched the tyre barriers. However he did not suffer any major damage and was able to continue. The pole position holder changed a number of times with Skaife, Whincup and Steven Richards among the drivers who temporarily held pole. Once qualifying finished, Mark Winterbottom had the quickest lap and took pole, from Garth Tander and team-mate Steven Richards in third.

Race 1
Garth Tander got off the line and beat Mark Winterbottom into the first corner. Meanwhile, Dean Canto ran wide at the first corner and into the gravel trap, causing the safety car to come out at the end of the first lap. The race was not a great one for Britek Motorsport, with both cars in the pits on lap 11 with Jason Bright’s car cutting out, which was the same problem that caused the accident at the BigPond 400 and Alan Gurr’s car having a sticky throttle. After the compulsory pit stop, Tander lost the lead to Winterbottom, and struggled to keep Steven Richards in third place. Tander managed to keep Richards behind him, and eventually pulled away from him. Eventually, Tander managed to get back past Winterbottom, and won the race, with Winterbottom in second and Rick Kelly in third.

Race 2
Even before the race had begun, there were problems for both Greg Murphy who had a stuck throttle in the installation laps before the race, and Andrew Jones who started from the pit lane. When the race started, Steven Richards had contact with Todd Kelly and spun off into the wall at turn 3. However he was able to continue, through also ran off the track at turn 5 a couple of laps later. At the hairpin (turn 5), Jamie Whincup overtook Garth Tander on the first lap, however Tander retook the position at the same location of lap 2. Andrew Jones had a new steering rack installed in his car due to problems in his steering and Paul Morris had engine dramas, which also caused his retirement in the first race. At the compulsory pit stop, Mark Winterbottom was able to overtake Tander, however he had a major brake lock-up into turn 5 on the out-lap, destroying his front left tyre and requiring a second pitstop. On lap 28, Jason Richards crashed at the hairpin, after having front left suspension failure, which caused the safety car to be deployed. The safety car was also deployed on lap 37, when Jason Bargwanna ran wide coming onto the front straight and crashed into the safety fence. This led to a sprint to the finish when the safety car came in, and Garth Tander won the race from Jamie Whincup and team mate Rick Kelly.

Race 3 
The race started with Jamie Whincup losing a number of spots to 4th, and Will Davison having minor front end damage after contact. On lap five, Paul Morris and Brad Jones collided in turn 7. The collision caused Morris to crash heavily into the barrier, rolled once and end up on its roof on the track, creating a safety car period. At the compulsory pit stop, leader Garth Tander had a cross-threaded nut on one of his wheels, and dropped 4 positions to 5th. After the pit stops, Rick Kelly lead from his brother Todd and James Courtney. On lap 27, Dean Canto crashed into the wall on the main straight, causing the safety car, to once again come out. This stayed out until lap 35, and due to other AFL commitments for the broadcaster, the race was cut short to a time based race, and Rick Kelly won the race from Todd Kelly and James Courtney. This caused controversy as some drivers, including Garth Tander, claimed they did not know the race was going to finish early.

Overall team mates Garth Tander and Rick Kelly were equal on points, however Kelly won the round after finishing higher in the final race.

In-Car Camera Coverage
The six in-car cameras in this round were Greg Murphy, Jason Bright, Rick Kelly, Craig Lowndes, Max Wilson and Paul Dumbrell.

References

External links
 PlaceMakers V8 Supercars website

Placemakers
Auto races in New Zealand
Place
April 2007 sports events in New Zealand